Rajaram Sharma (born 9 June 1963) is an Indian artist of Pichhwai and Indian miniature paintings.

Life 
He was born on 9 June 1963 in Bijolia in Bhilwara district of Rajasthan. He completed his early education in Bijolia. At the age of 13, he came to Nathdwara to train under Tulsidasji Chitrakar who was the head of Shrinathji temple. After spending 13 years learning with Tulsidasji, Sharma had made a name for himself. In 1989, B. G. Sharma, an eminent Pichhwai artist, took Rajaram under his wings to teach him the nuances of Pichhwai and miniature painting. The artist worked under him for ten years and became adept in both Pichwai and miniature paintings.

At the age of 22, the artist married Chhaya Sharma. Chhaya is the granddaughter of Bhuralal Sharma, a well-known Pichhwai artist from Nathdwara. Rajaram has two daughters, Swati Sharma and Jyoti Sharma, and a son, Rajat Sharma. Rajat is practicing miniature and contemporary art with his father.

Currently, the Rajaram works at his own studio, namely "Chitrashala", in Udaipur, where he also guides and trains upcoming artists.

Awards and honors 

National Merit Certificate, 2016 
All India Award of Traditional Art, Marudhara, Kolkata (W.B.), 2010 
 All  Award of Traditional Art, Ujjain,  (M.P.), 2004 
 Gold Medal in Traditional Painting at All Art Exhibition, Jangaon, Warangal (A.P.), 2002 
 All India Special Award of Traditional Art, T.A.H.S., Karnataka, 2001 
 All India Award of Traditional & Folk Art, SZCC, 2001 
 First Prize in District Handicraft Contest, Udaipur (Raj.), 1998 
 Specially Honored by Education Minister, 1998

References 

1963 births
Living people
People from Bhilwara district
Indian male painters